Thomas Dean Aaron (born February 22, 1937) is an American former  professional golfer who was a member of the PGA Tour during the 1960s, 1970s and 1980s. Aaron is best known for winning the 1973 Masters Tournament. He is also known for an error in the 1968 Masters Tournament, when he entered a 4 instead of a 3 on Roberto De Vicenzo's scorecard, which kept De Vicenzo out of a playoff for the championship.

Early years 
Thomas Dean Aaron was born on February 22, 1937, in Gainesville, Georgia. He began playing golf at age 12 and won two Georgia Amateur titles, two Southeastern Amateur events and two Georgia Open crowns, despite not having a golf course in his hometown.

College career 
Aaron attended the University of Florida, where he was a member of the Kappa Alpha Order Fraternity (Beta Zeta Chapter). While he was a Florida student, he played for the Florida Gators men's golf team from 1956 to 1959, was a member of the Gators' 1956 Southeastern Conference (SEC) championship team, and won the individual SEC championship in 1957 and 1958. He lost the U.S. Amateur final to Charles Coe in 1958, was a member of the 1959 Walker Cup team, and won the Western Amateur in 1960. He was recognized as an All-American in 1958 and 1959. Aaron graduated from the University of Florida with a bachelor's degree in business administration in 1960, and was later inducted into the University of Florida Athletic Hall of Fame as a "Gator Great."

Professional career 
Aaron turned pro in 1960. His first professional victory came at the 1969 Canadian Open. Although the event is historically considered a PGA Tour event, it was not that year. The following year he gained his first PGA Tour victory at the Atlanta Classic. In 1972, he won the Trophée Lancôme in France. Aaron's best money year was 1972, when he finished in ninth place on the PGA Tour money list.

Aaron won the Masters Tournament in 1973, which was his one major championship. He also finished in the top ten at the Masters from 1967 to 1970. His only other top ten major championship finishes came at the PGA Championship in 1965 and 1972. In 2000, he made the cut at the Masters at the age of 63, breaking a record previously held by Gary Player.

Aaron played for the U.S. team in the Ryder Cup in 1969 and 1973, and had a record of one win, one tie and four losses.

In the 1980s and 1990s, Aaron played on the Senior PGA Tour, winning $3,646,302. The 1992 Kaanapali Classic was his last professional win.

Aaron was a student of golf instructor Manuel de la Torre.

Aaron is also known for being the playing partner of Argentinian Roberto De Vicenzo for the final round of the 1968 Masters Tournament. On the seventeenth hole, Aaron incorrectly recorded a par 4 on De Vicenzo's scorecard, when his partner had actually scored a birdie 3 for the hole. Because De Vicenzo signed the scorecard without correcting the error, PGA rules required him to stand by the incorrect, higher score. Instead of a De Vicenzo–Bob Goalby playoff for the green jacket, Goalby won the tournament outright due to the technicality.

Ironically, Aaron's 4th round playing partner at the 1973 Masters, Johnny Miller, recorded a higher score when keeping Aaron's card. Aaron caught the mistake.

He was inducted into the Georgia Sports Hall of Fame in 1980, and the Georgia Golf Hall of Fame in 1989.

Amateur wins (8) 
1957 SEC Championship (individual), Georgia Amateur
1958 SEC Championship (individual), Southeastern Amateur
1959 Sunnehanna Amateur
1960 Western Amateur, Georgia Amateur, Southeastern Amateur

Professional wins (9)

PGA Tour wins (2)

PGA Tour playoff record (0–4)

Other wins (6) 
1957 Georgia Open (as an amateur)
1960 Georgia Open
1969 Canadian Open
1972 Trophée Lancôme, ABC Japan vs USA Golf Matches
1975 Georgia Open

Senior PGA Tour wins (1)

Senior PGA Tour playoff record (0–2)

Major championships

Wins (1)

Results timeline 
Amateur

Professional

CUT = missed the halfway cut
WD = withdrew
R256, R128, R64, R32, R16, QF, SF = Round in which player lost in match play
"T" indicates a tie for a place.

Source for The Masters: www.masters.com

Source for U.S. Open and U.S. Amateur: USGA Championship Database

Source for The British Open: www.opengolf.com

Source for PGA Championship: PGA Championship Media Guide

Source for 1959 British Amateur: The Glasgow Herald, May 26, 1959, pg. 6.

Results in senior majors
Results may not be in chronological order

Note: The Senior British Open Championship did not become a major until 2003.
NYF = Tournament not yet founded
DNP = did not play
CUT = missed the halfway cut
WD = withdrew
DQ = disqualified
"T" indicates a tie for a place
Yellow background for top-10.

U.S. national team appearances
Amateur
Walker Cup: 1959 (winners)

Professional
Ryder Cup: 1969 (winners), 1973 (winners)

See also 

List of American Ryder Cup golfers
List of Kappa Alpha Order members
List of Florida Gators men's golfers on the PGA Tour
List of University of Florida alumni
List of University of Florida Athletic Hall of Fame members

References

External links 

American male golfers
Florida Gators men's golfers
PGA Tour golfers
PGA Tour Champions golfers
Winners of men's major golf championships
Ryder Cup competitors for the United States
Golfers from Georgia (U.S. state)
People from Gainesville, Georgia
Sportspeople from the Atlanta metropolitan area
1937 births
Living people